Saad Khan is an Indian director, screenwriter and acting teacher and Improv comedian who works in films and web series. He is the founder and creative head of FirstAction Studios that recently merged with Mumbai-based media conglomerate Rainshine Entertainment. Khan is known for his Kannada-English feature film Humble Politician Nograj (2018), which became a hit and the first Kannada film to achieve world-wide digital audience presence on Amazon's PrimeVideo platform.

As a writer & director, Khan’s short film Another Kind of Black (2008) was screened at the Cannes Film Festival. During the first Covid lockdown, Khan created a Hindi web series and was also the chief writer for Ankahi Ansuni- a horror-thriller which is streaming on Disney+ Hotstar.

In addition to his directorial ventures - Station, Love & She, an indie Hollywood feature film on Amazon, and Humble Politician Nograj, Saad is also the host and creator of the live improvisational comedy show called The Improv, which became a platform for many stand-up and improv comedians in the country.

Early life 
Khan was born in Mumbai, India, and was raised in Bangalore. Khan is an alumnus of St. Joseph's College, eventually graduating as a mechanical engineer from M.S. Ramaiah Institute of Technology. While studying to be an engineer, he developed an interest in theatre at the age of 17 and started writing and directing plays, also spearheading a theatre group which then produced over 12 plays in a span of 4 years.

Khan decided to pursue a career in film and media. After graduating from college, Khan left for the United States to continue his education in filmmaking. He got a degree certificate in filmmaking from Tisch School of the Arts, New York University where he was also awarded a study scholarship and assistantship. Khan's determination to excel in filmmaking then took him to the University of Louisiana at Lafayette where he was awarded his master's degree in Communication and Media. He then returned to New York to complete the summer degree program in directing at Tisch.

Career 
Right after completing college, Saad Khan wrote and directed two short films, Another Kind of Black and On My Mind. The former was selected at the Short Film Corner of the Cannes Film Festival, and the latter was shot in the south of the US and was screened at the Acadiana Film Festival. On his return to India, Khan assisted Ashutosh Gowariker in the Bollywood film Khelein Hum Jee Jaan Sey almost immediately. After a 2-year stint in Mumbai, he founded his media company Firstaction Studios in Bangalore, which received recognition for content creation, ad films and commercials for brands, acting, communication and media workshops, producing stage shows, managing casting for films, ads, television commercials, viral videos and provides opportunities across India. Khan’s production of the live comedy show The Improv (India) became a popular feature for the Bangalore audience. Unscripted and unrehearsed, the show has Khan and 4 improv comedians perform improv comedy on the spot by taking scenarios from a live audience. The Improv was the first national act which was presented by Black Dog Easy Evenings in Hyderabad, after they toured with performers such as Russell Peters, Robert Schneider, and the team of Whose Line Is It Anyway? In addition to performing across major Indian metro cities, The Improv has toured internationally with well received shows in Dubai, Abu Dhabi, and Sweden.

Khan then moved into ideating and creating something with Danish Sait that changed the face of Kannada filmmaking- Humble Politician Nograj. The movie was a satirical take on a narcissistic and crazy politician's ambition to go from a small time corporator to an influential MLA. Humble Politician Nograj also created a strong buzz by becoming the first Kannada feature film to find its place on the international OTT platform - Amazon PrimeVideo. With web series and online shows catching up with the audiences, Khan and team decided to give it an online push with a web series. Instead of a film sequel to Humble Politician Nograj, Khan and Sait made the sequel as a web series in association with Applause Entertainment and the first season focused on Nograj's journey after he became an MLA. Khan also stated that the idea to push it online was creatively focused.

The Nograj web series has been written and directed by Khan in association with Danish Sait and executed by FirstAction Studios. The primary producer is Sameer Nair, the CEO of Applause Entertainment and the content publisher of shows such as Scam, Criminal Justice (Indian TV series), Hostages (Indian TV series) and Maaz Khan of FirstAction Studios. The show released on Voot in 2022 to rave reviews.

Khan's venture with Danish Sait – FirstAction, under which the movie Humble Politician Nograj was created has recently given significant stakes to Mumbai-based Rainshine Entertainment in a strategic move.

Khan has also conducted numerous acting workshops and mentored many artists. Some of his students include famous comics such as Sumukhi Suresh, Kenny Sebastian, and actors Samyukta Hornad, Ria Nalavade, Medha Rana, Fahmaan Khan, Ayn Zoya and many more. Khan has written and created the web series Ankahi Ansuni, a thriller about a Sub Inspector caught in the web of myths and superstitions as he tries to solve strange crimes in a small north Indian town. It was released 15 July 2021 on Disney+ Hotstar. Also featured on the same OTT platform is Chattis Aur Maina, a story about a dancer girl (a Nachaniya) and what happens when she falls in love with a decent man who has a heart of gold and the soul of a poet, conceptualized by Khan and Saishree D.

Khan's upcoming film Sangeet is a romantic comedy-drama written and directed by Saad Khan himself and produced by Chandru Manoharan of Lahari Music and Nikhil Kumarswamy. It will mark FirstAction's foray into full-length features and theatrical releases in the Telugu industry.

Web series

Humble Politician Nograj 
Saad had his debut OTT release with Humble Politician Nograj Season 1 produced by Applause Entertainment in association with FirstAction Studios and it premiered on Voot Select in January 2022. Written and directed by Saad, the series begins with a moving tribute to the Kannada actor Puneeth Rajkumar (Appu) who died in 2021. It is a sequel to the 2018 film Humble Politician Nograj, in which Puneeth had played a cameo.

The first season has total 10 episodes and each episode with the running time duration of 30 minutes. The Show deals with the horse-trading after a fractured mandate and the desire to hold on to power.

Reviews 
Subha J Rao of Firstpost stated "The show, produced by Sameer Nair, Maaz Khan, Danish Sait and Saad Khan, is deeply irreverent, and it is refreshing to see no one being spared. We should all learn to laugh and lighten up a bit. When Nograj can, can’t we?"

A critic for Cinema Express said "Nograj is back and chutzpah is intact!."

Personal life 
Khan has a younger brother, Maaz Khan, who is a partner and producer at FirstAction studios. His mother, Sabiha Zubair and sister Safa Khan have been cited as a strong influence on Khan.

Awards and honours 

 Young Achiever in Media by Whistling Woods International
 Award in Recognition for Excellence in Media by Symbiosis International University
 Awarded Outstanding Alumnus by the University of Louisiana at Lafayette, Department of Communication
 Karnataka Award - department of youth empowerment and sports.[20
 Nominated for SIIMA Award for Best Debut Director (Kannada) at the 8th South Indian International Movie Awards

Filmography

Director

References

External links 

 First Action Media
 
 Saad Khan speaking at TEDxMAIS

Film directors from Mumbai
Living people
Year of birth missing (living people)
Film producers from Mumbai
Film directors from Bangalore
Hindi-language film directors
21st-century Indian film directors